Oldenswort is a municipality in the district of Nordfriesland, in Schleswig-Holstein, Germany, next to the river Eider.

Personalities
The earliest atheist known by name in modern Europe, Matthias Knutzen, was born here sometime in early 1646. The founder of German sociology, Ferdinand Tönnies (1855-1936), was born here. A memorial of him was unveiled in 1990.

Other notable natives of Oldenswort
 Johan Samuel Augustin (1715–1785) German-Danish astronomical writer and civil servant

See also
Eiderstedt peninsula

References

Nordfriesland